Benoît Raclet (1780–1844) was a French inventor.

1780 births
1844 deaths
19th-century French inventors
French viticulturists
People from Roanne